The Mary Washington Eagles are the athletic teams that represent the University of Mary Washington, located in Fredericksburg, Virginia, in NCAA Division III intercollegiate sports. The Eagles compete as members of the Coast to Coast Athletic Conference (C2C; known as the Capital Athletic Conference before November 2020). All together, Mary Washington sponsors 20 sports: nine for men and 11 for women. The program will add its 21st sport, men's golf, in 2016.

History
As of 2016, the Eagles have had more than 200 student-athletes achieve All-American status. Four UMW teams have won four national championships (1982 AIAW champion women's tennis, 1988 NCAA Division III women's tennis, 1991 NCAA Division III women's tennis, 2017 USA Rugby Men's Division 1AA Fall National Championship).

Varsity sports

Men's sports
 Baseball
 Basketball
 Cross Country
 Golf (2016)
 Lacrosse
 Riding
 Soccer
 Swimming
 Tennis
 Track & Field
 Rugby

Women's sports
 Basketball
 Cross Country
 Field Hockey
 Lacrosse
 Riding
 Soccer
 Softball
 Swimming
 Tennis
 Track & Field
 Volleyball

Varsity Athletics

Basketball
The women's basketball team has advanced to three straight Sweet 16s, including a third-place finish at the 2007 Final Four. Mary Washington's men's basketball advanced to the national quarterfinals in 2014. In 2016 the women's team advanced again to the 1st round of the NCAA Tournament after winning the Capital Athletic Conference Championship.

Field Hockey
The UMW advanced to the final four in 2012.

Swimming
UMW's women's swimming team has won all 26 C2C Championships in the history of the conference, while the men's swim team has won 16 C2C Championships in a row with 21 out of 25 total belonging to the Eagles. The women's team boasts 39 All Americans and 17 Academic All Americans. One of which, Shannon Hutcherson, became the first Eagle in both men's and women's swimming to win a National Title in 1998. The men's team has boasted 11 All Americans and Academic All Americans. The program's most decorated athlete and UMW's most decorated athlete, Alex Anderson, won 4 national titles (2013 400 yard IM, 2014 400 yard IM and 200 yard Butterfly, 2015 200 yard Butterfly) and set 3 national records (2014 400 yard IM and 200 yard Butterfly, 2015 200 yard Butterfly) during his 4-year tenure at the program.

Tennis
The men's tennis team has advanced to 15 NCAA Tournaments, finishing in the top eight four times. The women's program has advanced to the second most NCAA tournaments in all of DIII women's tennis dating back to the 1990s.

Club Sports
The University features a number of popular club teams, including boxing, tennis,  and ultimate frisbee.

Rowing
The University of Mary Washington Rowing team has garnered recognition. The crew team at the University of Mary Washington was created in 2007, where it had initially received varsity status. The status of the team as a varsity program was garnished in 2014, where it was demoted to a club sport. In the fall of 2015, it was announced that Crew along with the Mary Washington Rugby program would fall under the athletics category. Falling under the category of athletics, this allows both men and women team a number of benefits. These benefits include; head coaches, access to athletic facilities, access to the varsity weight room, the ability to practice on varsity turf and an efficient budget. Discussions have been in the works with the crew teams and athletics about receiving varsity status in the near future.

Rugby
In 2014, after seven previous appearances, the women's rugby club won the USA Rugby Women's Collegiate Division II National Championship. The university offered scholarships to athletes in the UMW women's rugby program during 2015-2016 academic year. Like the crew teams, the rugby programs currently fall under the varsity athletics umbrella as well.

In May 2018, after going defeated for the entire academic year through conference play and the 2017 USA Rugby Fall Playoffs defeating St Josephs in the final in December 2017. The Men's rugby team would go on to beat Dartmouth College 38-30 in the D1AA National Championship game in Fullteron, California with Captain Matthew Gordon receiving MVP honours for the game.

References

External links
 Official website of Mary Washington Eagles Athletics